The Colorado Springs Sky Sox were a Minor League Baseball team in Colorado Springs, Colorado. The team played in the Pacific Coast League (PCL) and was the Triple-A affiliate of the major league Milwaukee Brewers (2015–2018), Colorado Rockies (1993–2014), and Cleveland Indians (1988–1992). The Sky Sox won the PCL title in 1992 and 1995.

History
From 1950 to 1958, the original incarnation of the Colorado Springs Sky Sox were a Class A affiliate of the Chicago White Sox in the Western League. The Sky Sox's nickname originated with their affiliation with the White Sox. The Pikes Peak region was without professional baseball for 30 years until 1988, when the Hawaii Islanders of the PCL relocated to Colorado Springs and became the second incarnation of the Sky Sox. From 1988 to 1992 the Sky Sox were the Triple-A affiliate of the Cleveland Indians. When Denver was awarded a major league franchise for the 1993 season, the new Colorado Rockies arranged for the Sky Sox to become their top farm team.

During their first season, the Sky Sox moved from Spurgeon Stadium (in Memorial Park) to the brand new Sky Sox Stadium, later known as Security Service Field. The ballpark, on the eastern edge of Colorado Springs, cost US$3.4 million to build and held 8,500 spectators. In later years, the Sky Sox invested over $8 million in ballpark renovations which included a new video scoreboard, redesigned entrance plaza, new picnic facility and banquet hall.

On June 21, 2017, team owner David G. Elmore announced the relocation of the Sky Sox Triple-A franchise to San Antonio, Texas, in 2019, with the team continuing to compete in the Pacific Coast League as the San Antonio Missions, who were previously members of the Double-A Texas League. Concurrent with this move, the Rookie Helena Brewers of the Pioneer League relocated to Colorado Springs, operating as the Rocky Mountain Vibes.

Notable alumni

Sandy Alomar Jr.
Nolan Arenado
Garrett Atkins
Brad Ausmus
Albert Belle
Vinny Castilla
Alan Cockrell
Craig Counsell
Joe Girardi
Jimmy Gobble
Carlos González
Brad Hawpe
Todd Helton
Matt Holliday
Doug Jones
Gabe Kapler
Juan Pierre
Scott Podsednik
Jim Thome
Mike Hargrove (Manager)
Charlie Manuel (Manager)

References

External links

Colorado Springs Sky Sox official website

 
Defunct Pacific Coast League teams
Sports in Colorado Springs, Colorado
Professional baseball teams in Colorado
Baseball teams established in 1988
Baseball teams disestablished in 2018
1988 establishments in Colorado
Cleveland Guardians minor league affiliates
Colorado Rockies minor league affiliates
Milwaukee Brewers minor league affiliates
2018 disestablishments in Colorado
Defunct baseball teams in Colorado